Oregon Route 245 (OR 245) is an Oregon state highway running from Salisbury to Unity. OR 245 is known as the Dooley Mountain Highway No. 415 (see Oregon highways and routes).

OR 245 was the highest-numbered state route in Oregon before 2002, when the state began issuing route numbers to previously unrouted highways.

Route description 

OR 245 begins at an intersection with US 26 near Unity and continues north, east, and north through Hereford to Salisbury, where it ends at an intersection with OR 7.

History 

The Dooley Mountain Highway can be traced to a private toll road constructed in the mid-19th century.  It was owned by John J. Dooley, an Eastern Oregon pioneer who arrived in 1862, and the mountain was subsequently named after him.  In 1889, it was acquired by Baker County and became a public road.

The road was made part of the Baker-Unity Highway in 1917.  In 1932, the Baker-Unity Highway was designated OR 7.

In 1981, the Baker-Unity Highway was divided between the Whitney Highway No. 71 and the Dooley Mountain Highway.  The Dooley Mountain Highway was redesignated OR 245.

Major intersections

References 

 Oregon Department of Transportation, Descriptions of US and Oregon Routes, https://web.archive.org/web/20051102084300/http://www.oregon.gov/ODOT/HWY/TRAFFIC/TEOS_Publications/PDF/Descriptions_of_US_and_Oregon_Routes.pdf, page 22.
 GORP, Elkhorn Drive Scenic Byway - Oregon Scenic Drives, http://www.gorp.com/weekend-guide/travel-ta-scenic-drives-north-powder-oregon-sidwcmdev_052638.html
 Oregon Highways, Baker-Unity Highway #13 (archive), https://web.archive.org/web/20050207120803/http://www.ylekot.com/orehwys/hwy-13.html

245
Transportation in Baker County, Oregon